Below are the squads for the Football at the 1987 Mediterranean Games, hosted in Latakia, Syria, and took place between 15 and 25 September 1987.

Group A

Algeria B
Coach:

France B
Coach: Jack Braun

Greece Ol.

Morocco Ol.

Group B

Lebanon
Coach:

San Marino

Syria
Coach:  Valeriy Yaremchenko

Turkey B
Coach:

References

1987
Sports at the 1987 Mediterranean Games